Anarrhinum longipedicellatum is a species of flowering plant in the toadflax tribe Antirrhineae, endemic to central Portugal. It inhabits rocky areas and embankments, in dry and exposed sites, on acidic substrates.

References

Plantaginaceae
Endemic flora of Portugal
Endemic flora of the Iberian Peninsula